Phillip Menzel (born 18 August 1998) is a German professional footballer who plays as a goalkeeper for Austrian Bundesliga club Austria Klagenfurt.

Career
Menzel signed his first professional contract with VfL Wolfsburg in 2016. In mid-2020, he moved to Austrian club Austria Klagenfurt. Menzel made his professional debut for Klagenfurt in the Austrian Football Second League on 4 October 2020, starting in the home match against Floridsdorfer AC, which finished as a 5–0 win.

References

External links
 
 
 
 
 

1998 births
Living people
Sportspeople from Kiel
Footballers from Schleswig-Holstein
German footballers
Association football goalkeepers
Germany youth international footballers
VfL Wolfsburg II players
VfL Wolfsburg players
SK Austria Klagenfurt players
Regionalliga players
2. Liga (Austria) players
Austrian Football Bundesliga players
German expatriate footballers
German expatriate sportspeople in Austria
Expatriate footballers in Austria